Intuitively, an algorithmically random sequence (or random sequence) is a sequence of binary digits that appears random to any algorithm running on a (prefix-free or not) universal Turing machine.  The notion can be applied analogously to sequences on any finite alphabet (e.g. decimal digits). Random sequences are key objects of study in algorithmic information theory.

As different types of algorithms are sometimes considered, ranging from algorithms with specific bounds on their running time to algorithms which may ask questions of an oracle machine, there are different notions of randomness. The most common of these is known as Martin-Löf randomness (K-randomness or 1-randomness), but stronger and weaker forms of randomness also exist. When the term "algorithmically random" is used to refer to a particular single (finite or infinite) sequence without clarification, it is usually taken to mean "incompressible" or, in the case the sequence is infinite and prefix algorithmically random (i.e., K-incompressible), "Martin-Löf–Chaitin random". 

It is important to disambiguate between algorithmic randomness and stochastic randomness. Unlike algorithmic randomness, which is defined for computable (and thus deterministic) processes, stochastic randomness is usually said to be a property of a sequence that is a priori known to be generated by (or is the outcome of) an independent identically distributed equiprobable stochastic process.

Because infinite sequences of binary digits can be identified with real numbers in the unit interval, random binary sequences are often called (algorithmically) random real numbers. Additionally, infinite binary sequences correspond to characteristic functions of sets of natural numbers; therefore those sequences might be seen as sets of natural numbers.

The class of all Martin-Löf random (binary) sequences is denoted by RAND or MLR.

History 

The first suitable definition of a random sequence was given by Per Martin-Löf in 1966. Earlier researchers such as Richard von Mises had attempted to formalize the notion of a test for randomness in order to define a random sequence as one that passed all tests for randomness; however, the precise notion of a randomness test was left vague. Martin-Löf's key insight was to use the theory of computation to formally define the notion of a test for randomness. This contrasts with the idea of randomness in probability; in that theory, no particular element of a sample space can be said to be random.

Since its inception, Martin-Löf randomness has been shown to admit many equivalent characterizations—in terms of compression, randomness tests, and gambling—that bear little outward resemblance to the original definition, but each of which satisfy our intuitive notion of properties that random sequences ought to have: random sequences should be incompressible, they should pass statistical tests for randomness, and it should be difficult to make money betting on them. The existence of these multiple definitions of Martin-Löf randomness, and the stability of these definitions under different models of computation, give evidence that Martin-Löf randomness is a fundamental property of mathematics and not an accident of Martin-Löf's particular model. The thesis that the definition of Martin-Löf randomness "correctly" captures the intuitive notion of randomness has been called the Martin-Löf–Chaitin Thesis; it is somewhat similar to the Church–Turing thesis.

Three equivalent definitions 

Martin-Löf's original definition of a random sequence was in terms of constructive null covers; he defined a sequence to be random if it is not contained in any such cover.  Gregory Chaitin, Leonid Levin and Claus-Peter Schnorr proved a characterization in terms of algorithmic complexity:  a sequence is random if there is a uniform bound on the compressibility of its initial segments.   Schnorr gave a third equivalent definition in terms of martingales.  Li and Vitanyi's book An Introduction to Kolmogorov Complexity and Its Applications is the standard introduction to these ideas.

 Algorithmic complexity (Chaitin 1969, Schnorr 1973, Levin 1973): Algorithmic complexity (also known as (prefix-free) Kolmogorov complexity or program-size complexity) can be thought of as a lower bound on the algorithmic compressibility of a finite sequence (of characters or binary digits). It assigns to each such sequence w a natural number K(w) that, intuitively, measures the minimum length of a computer program (written in some fixed programming language) that takes no input and will output w when run. The complexity is required to be prefix-free:  The program (a sequence of 0 and 1) is followed by an infinite string of 0s, and the length of the program (assuming it halts) includes the number of zeroes to the right of the program that the universal Turing machine reads.  The additional requirement is needed because we can choose a length such that the length codes information about the substring.  Given a natural number c and a sequence w, we say that w is c-incompressible if .
An infinite sequence S is Martin-Löf random if and only if there is a constant c such that all of Ss finite prefixes are c-incompressible.

 Constructive null covers (Martin-Löf 1966): This is Martin-Löf's original definition. For a finite binary string w we let Cw denote the cylinder generated by w. This is the set of all infinite sequences beginning with w,  which is a basic open set in Cantor space. The product measure  μ(Cw) of the cylinder generated by w is defined to be  2−|w|. Every open subset of Cantor space is the union of a countable sequence of disjoint basic open sets, and the measure of an open set is the sum of the measures of any such sequence. An effective open set is an open set that is the union of the sequence of basic open sets determined by a recursively enumerable sequence of binary strings. Every effective null cover determines a  set of measure 0, namely the intersection of the sets .  
A sequence is defined to be Martin-Löf random if it is not contained in any  set determined by a constructive null cover.

 Constructive martingales (Schnorr 1971): A martingale is a function  such that, for all finite strings w, where  is the concatenation of the strings a and b. This is called the "fairness condition": if a martingale is viewed as a betting strategy, then the above condition requires that the bettor plays against fair odds. A martingale d is said to succeed on a sequence S if  where  is the first n bits of S. A martingale d is constructive (also known as weakly computable, lower semi-computable) if there exists a computable function  such that, for all finite binary strings w
  for all positive integers t,
  
A sequence is Martin-Löf random if and only if no constructive martingale succeeds on it.

 Interpretations of the definitions 

The Kolmogorov complexity characterization conveys the intuition that a random sequence is incompressible: no prefix can be produced by a program much shorter than the prefix.

The null cover characterization conveys the intuition that a random real number should not have any property that is "uncommon".  Each measure 0 set can be thought of as an uncommon property.  It is not possible for a sequence to lie in no measure 0 sets, because each one-point set has measure 0.  Martin-Löf's idea was to limit the definition to measure 0 sets that are effectively describable; the definition of an effective null cover determines a countable collection of effectively describable measure 0 sets and defines a sequence to be random if it does not lie in any of these particular measure 0 sets.   Since the union of a countable collection of measure 0 sets has measure 0, this definition immediately leads to the theorem that there is a measure 1 set of random sequences. Note that if we identify the Cantor space of binary sequences with the interval [0,1] of real numbers, the measure on Cantor space agrees with Lebesgue measure.

The martingale characterization conveys the intuition that no effective procedure should be able to make money betting against a random sequence.   A martingale d is a betting strategy. d reads a finite string w and bets money on the next bit. It bets some fraction of its money that the next bit will be 0, and then remainder of its money that the next bit will be 1. d doubles the money it placed on the bit that actually occurred, and it loses the rest. d(w) is the amount of money it has after seeing the string w. Since the bet placed after seeing the string w can be calculated from the values d(w), d(w0), and d(w1), calculating the amount of money it has is equivalent to calculating the bet. The martingale characterization says that no betting strategy implementable by any computer (even in the weak sense of constructive strategies, which are not necessarily computable) can make money betting on a random sequence.

Properties and examples of Martin-Löf random sequences
 Chaitin's halting probability Ω is an example of a random sequence.
 RANDc (the complement of RAND) is a measure 0 subset of the set of all infinite sequences. This is implied by the fact that each constructive null cover covers a measure 0 set, there are only countably many constructive null covers, and a countable union of measure 0 sets has measure 0. This implies that RAND is a measure 1 subset of the set of all infinite sequences.
 Every random sequence is normal.
 There is a constructive null cover of RANDc. This means that all effective tests for randomness (that is,  constructive null covers) are, in a sense, subsumed by this universal test for randomness, since any sequence that passes this single test for randomness will pass all tests for randomness. (Martin-Löf 1966)
 There is a universal constructive martingale d. This martingale is universal in the sense that, given any constructive martingale d, if d succeeds on a sequence, then d succeeds on that sequence as well. Thus, d succeeds on every sequence in RANDc (but, since d''' is constructive, it succeeds on no sequence in RAND). (Schnorr 1971)
 The class RAND is a  subset of Cantor space, where  refers to the second level of the arithmetical hierarchy. This is because a sequence S is in RAND if and only if there is some open set in the universal effective null cover that does not contain S; this property can be seen to be definable by a  formula.
(Schnorr 1971)  Chaitin's Ω is an example of such a sequence.
 No random sequence is decidable, computably enumerable, or co-computably-enumerable.
 Every sequence is Turing reducible to some random sequence. (Kučera 1985/1989, Gács 1986).  Thus there are random sequences of arbitrarily high Turing degree.

 Relative randomness 
As each of the equivalent definitions of a Martin-Löf random sequence is based on what is computable by some Turing machine, one can naturally ask what is computable by a Turing oracle machine. For a fixed oracle A, a sequence B which is not only random but in fact, satisfies the equivalent definitions for computability relative to A (e.g., no martingale which is constructive relative to the oracle A succeeds on B) is said to be random relative to A. Two sequences, while themselves random, may contain very similar information, and therefore neither will be random relative to the other. Any time there is a Turing reduction from one sequence to another, the second sequence cannot be random relative to the first, just as computable sequences are themselves nonrandom; in particular, this means that Chaitin's Ω is not random relative to the halting problem.

An important result relating to relative randomness is van Lambalgen's theorem, which states that if C is the sequence composed from A and B by interleaving the first bit of A, the first bit of B, the second bit of A, the second bit of B, and so on, then C is algorithmically random if and only if A is algorithmically random, and B is algorithmically random relative to A. A closely related consequence is that if A and B are both random themselves, then A is random relative to B if and only if B is random relative to A.

 Stronger than Martin-Löf randomness 
Relative randomness gives us the first notion which is stronger than Martin-Löf randomness, which is randomness relative to some fixed oracle A. For any oracle, this is at least as strong, and for most oracles, it is strictly stronger, since there will be Martin-Löf random sequences which are not random relative to the oracle A. Important oracles often considered are the halting problem, and the nth jump oracle, as these oracles are able to answer specific questions which naturally arise. A sequence which is random relative to the oracle  is called n-random; a sequence is 1-random, therefore, if and only if it is Martin-Löf random. A sequence which is n-random for every n is called arithmetically random. The n''-random sequences sometimes arise when considering more complicated properties. For example, there are only countably many  sets, so one might think that these should be non-random.

Weaker than Martin-Löf randomness 
Additionally, there are several notions of randomness which are weaker than Martin-Löf randomness. Some of these are weak 1-randomness, Schnorr randomness, computable randomness, partial computable randomness. Yongge Wang showed  
that Schnorr randomness is different from computable randomness. Additionally, Kolmogorov–Loveland randomness is known to be no stronger than Martin-Löf randomness, but it is not known whether it is actually weaker. 

At the opposite end of the randomness spectrum there is the notion of a  K-trivial set. These sets are anti-random in that all initial segment is logarithmically compressible (i.e.,  for each initial segment w), but they are not computable.

See also
Random sequence
Gregory Chaitin
Stochastics
Monte Carlo method
K-trivial set
Universality probability
Statistical randomness

References

Further reading

Randomness
Algorithmic information theory